Raheem Blackshear (born June 5, 1998) is an American football running back for the Carolina Panthers of the National Football League (NFL). He played college football at Rutgers and Virginia Tech.

Professional career

Buffalo Bills
Blackshear signed with the Buffalo Bills as an undrafted free agent on May 13, 2022. He was waived by on August 30, 2022, and signed to the practice squad the next day.

Carolina Panthers
On September 21, 2022, Blackshear was signed by the Carolina Panthers off the Bills practice squad.

References

External links
Rutgers Scarlet Knights bio
Virginia Tech Hokies bio
Buffalo Bills bio

1998 births
Living people
American football running backs
Virginia Tech Hokies football players
Buffalo Bills players
Carolina Panthers players
Rutgers Scarlet Knights football players